The rattling cisticola (Cisticola chiniana) is a species of bird in the family Cisticolidae which is native to Africa south of the equator, and parts of East Africa. It is a common to abundant species in open savanna and scrubland habitats, whether in arid, moist or upland regions. Especially during summer, it is highly conspicuous due to its strident and repetitive call-notes from prominent perches.

Range
It is found in Angola, Botswana, Burundi, Republic of the Congo, DRC, Eswatini, Ethiopia, Kenya, Malawi, Mozambique, Namibia, Somalia, South Africa, South Sudan, Tanzania, Uganda, Zambia, and Zimbabwe.

Habitat
Its natural habitat is arid, mesic or moist savannas and woodland, often dominated by thorn trees or thorn shrub (Dichrostachys, etc.). It is, however, also commonly found in miombo and mopane woodland, and is one of the commonest bird species on the Mozambican coastal plain. It is also present in the Eastern Highlands and the East African uplands below 2,000 m. In addition it utilizes some ecotones including edges of cultivation, fringes of dense woodland and woodland fringing the Okavango delta.

Tinkling cisticola replaces it in stunted broad-leaved woodland and dry deciduous woodland on sandy substrates, while various Cisticola species replace it in marshy situations. It co-occurs with various Prinia species.

Habits
Especially in summer, much time is spent calling prominently from the top of a tree or bush. The strident call can be rendered as "chee-chee chichi-chirrrrr", but varies somewhat from individual to individual.

Nesting

Breeding occurs during the wet season in spring and summer. They build a ball-shaped nest of very coarse grass blades, which is lined on the inside with fine plant material.

Subspecies
Some seventeen subspecies are accepted:
 C. c. simplex (Heuglin, 1869) — South Sudan and DRC to Uganda
 C. c. fortis Lynes, 1930 — Gabon, the Congos and Angola to Zambia
 C. c. fricki Mearns, 1913 — Ethiopian and northern Kenyan highlands
 C. c. humilis Madarász, 1904 — eastern Ugandan and western Kenyan highlands
 C. c. ukamba Lynes, 1930 — highlands of central Kenya and northern Tanzania
 C. c. heterophrys Oberholser, 1906 — Kenyan and Tanzanian coastal plains
 C. c. victoria Lynes, 1930 — eastern circumference of Lake Victoria
 C. c. fischeri Reichenow, 1891 — Tanzania
 C. c. keithi Parkes, 1987 — Tanzania
 C. c. mbeya Parkes, 1987 — Tanzania
 C. c. emendatus Vincent, 1944 — southern Tanzania, Malawi and northern Mozambique
 C. c. procerus W.K.H.Peters, 1868 — eastern Zambia to central Mozambique
 C. c. bensoni Traylor, 1964 — southern Zambia
 C. c. smithersi B.P.Hall, 1956 — upper Zambezi river region
 C. c. chiniana (A.Smith, 1843) — central plateau of southern Africa
 C. c. frater Reichenow, 1916 — Namibia
 C. c. campestris Gould, 1845 — eastern coastal plain of southern Africa

Gallery

References

External links
 Rattling cisticola - Species text in The Atlas of Southern African Birds.

rattling cisticola
Birds of Sub-Saharan Africa
rattling cisticola
Taxonomy articles created by Polbot